Rhabdoena is a genus of gastropods belonging to the family Enidae.

The species of this genus are found in Aegean Sea.

Species:

Rhabdoena armenica 
Rhabdoena cosensis 
Rhabdoena gosteliae 
Rhabdoena gostelii 
Rhabdoena mirifica 
Rhabdoena stokesi 
Rhabdoena zasiensis

References

Enidae